Somjet Sattabud (born July 7, 1981), simply known as Jet, is a Thai retired professional footballer who played as a forward.

International

Honours

Club
Buriram
 Thai Division 1 League (1): 2011

Buriram United
 Thai FA Cup (1): 2012 
 Thai League Cup (1): 2012

External links
 

1981 births
Living people
Somjet Sattabud
Somjet Sattabud
Association football forwards
Somjet Sattabud
Somjet Sattabud
Somjet Sattabud
Somjet Sattabud
Somjet Sattabud
Somjet Sattabud
Somjet Sattabud